Voice of Russia, commonly abbreviated VOR, was the Russian government's international radio broadcasting service from 1993 until 2014, when it was reorganised as Radio Sputnik. Its interval signal was a chime version of 'Majestic' chorus from the Great Gate of Kiev portion of Pictures at an Exhibition by Mussorgsky.

History
Russian President Boris Yeltsin issued a decree on 22 December 1993 which reorganised Radio Moscow under a new name: Voice of Russia.

On 9 December 2013, Russian President Vladimir Putin issued a presidential decree dissolving the Voice of Russia as an agency, and merging it with RIA Novosti to form the Rossiya Segodnya international news agency.

Margarita Simonyan, editor-in-chief of the Rossiya Segodnya, said in March 2014 that "We will stop using obsolete radio broadcasting models, when the signal is transmitted without any control and when it is impossible to calculate who listens to it and where." The Voice of Russia ceased shortwave and European mediumwave radio broadcasts on 1 April 2014. The service continued to be available worldwide via the internet, in selected regions on satellite, and in several cities on FM, AM (in North America) or local digital radio.

On 10 November 2014, the Voice of Russia was replaced by Radio Sputnik, part of the Sputnik News multimedia platform operated by Rossiya Segodnya.

Broadcast languages
By 2013, the Voice of Russia had been broadcasting in 38 languages, including:

Albanian
Armenian
Arabic
Azerbaijani
Bengali
Bulgarian
Chinese
Crimean Tatar
Czech
Dari
English
French
German
Hausa
Hindi
Hungarian
Italian
Japanese
Kurdish
Kyrgyz
Moldovan
Mongolian
Norwegian
Pashto
Persian
Polish
Portuguese
Russian
Serbian
Spanish
Turkish
Ukrainian
Urdu
Uzbek

See also

References

Radio stations established in 1993
1993 establishments in Russia
Radio stations in Russia
State media
Radio networks
Propaganda radio broadcasts
Russian propaganda organizations
Russian-language radio stations
International broadcasters
English-language radio stations
Arabic-language radio stations
Armenian-language radio stations
Azerbaijani-language radio stations
Chinese-language radio stations
German-language radio stations
Greek-language radio stations
French-language radio stations
Korean-language radio stations
Portuguese-language radio stations
Persian-language radio stations
Romanian-language radio stations
Spanish-language radio stations
Turkish-language radio stations
Radio stations disestablished in 2014
2014 disestablishments in Russia
Defunct radio stations in Russia